Hyde Park Corner is a London Underground station near Hyde Park Corner in Hyde Park. It is in Travelcard Zone 1, between Knightsbridge and Green Park on the Piccadilly line.

History
The station was opened by the Great Northern, Piccadilly and Brompton Railway on 15 December 1906. It was the connecting station between the two original companies, the London United Railway and the Piccadilly and City Railway, who amalgamated after Parliament demanded the entire line from Hammersmith to Finsbury Park should be built as one scheme.

The original, Leslie Green-designed station building still remains to the south of the road junction, notable by its ox-blood coloured tiles; it was until June 2010 used as a pizza restaurant, and since 14 December 2012 it has been the Wellesley Hotel. The building was taken out of use when the station was provided with escalators in place of lifts and a new sub-surface ticket hall that came into use on 23 May 1932  although an emergency stairway provides a connection to the platforms. The lift shafts are now used to provide ventilation. The 1932 station had showcases inset to the walls that showed a series of dioramas depicting the development of the London bus – long gone, some of the scale models survive in the LT Museum Collections.

When the station was rebuilt with escalators the adjacent little-used station at Down Street to the east (towards Green Park) was taken out of use.

Present day
It is one of the few stations which have no associated buildings above ground, the station being fully underground. The current entrance to the station is accessed from within the pedestrian underpass system around the Hyde Park Corner junction.

When the central section of the Piccadilly line is closed, the station becomes the terminus of the western part due to the crossover tunnel to the east of the station.

Connections
London Buses routes 2, 9, 13, 14, 16, 19, 22, 23, 36, 38, 52, 74, 137, 148, 390, 414 and night routes N9, N16, N19, N22, N38 and N74 serve the station.
Green Line Coaches routes 701 and 702 serve the station.

Image gallery

References
Citations

Sources

 

Piccadilly line stations
London Underground Night Tube stations
Tube stations in the City of Westminster
Former Great Northern, Piccadilly and Brompton Railway stations
Railway stations in Great Britain opened in 1906
Hyde Park, London
Buildings and structures on Piccadilly
Leslie Green railway stations